is a Japanese director, animator, and screenwriter.

Kitakubo began work in the anime industry as a teenager, having worked on the 1979 Mobile Suit Gundam television series. He debuted as a director with the Cream Lemon episode "Pop Chaser" in 1985, then worked on films including Black Magic M-66 with Masamune Shirow and Akira with Katsuhiro Otomo. Kitakubo went on to direct the "A Tale of Two Robots" segment from Robot Carnival, the original video animation (OVA) series Golden Boy, and the films Roujin Z and Blood: The Last Vampire. In 2001, Kitakubo won the "Individual Award" at The 6th Animation Kobe for the latter film. Blood: The Last Vampire also won grand prize at the 2000 Japan Media Arts Festival and first prize the  2001 World Animation Celebration.

References

External links
 
 

1963 births
Anime directors
Living people
Japanese animators
Japanese animated film directors
Japanese film directors
Japanese screenwriters
People from Tokyo